Ellinor is a ghost town in Chase County, Kansas, United States.  It was located southwest of Saffordville, where the BNSF Railway splits.

History
Ellinor (or Elinor) had a post office from 1871 until 1881.

References

Further reading

External links
 Chase County maps: Current, Historic, KDOT

Unincorporated communities in Chase County, Kansas
Unincorporated communities in Kansas